Callum Dolan (born 29 September 2000) is an English professional footballer who plays as a midfielder for Fleetwood Town.

Career
After playing youth football for Manchester United, Blackburn Rovers and Bury, Dolan signed for Stockport Town in November 2018 before moving on to Altrincham in February 2019. He turned professional with Oldham Athletic in August 2019, signing a one-year deal, with the option of a further year. He had scored against the Latics in a pre-season friendly for Ashton United and had also featured against them for Stockport County. He made his professional debut a week later in the 3–2 EFL Trophy Group Stage win over Liverpool U21 at Boundary Park, replacing Urko Vera as a second-half substitute. On 30 August 2019, he was sent out on a one-month rolling loan to Northern Premier League Premier Division side Ashton United, where he went on to make two appearances. On 27 September 2019, his contract at Oldham was terminated following his young offender institution sentencing. The club commented, "Following the police investigation and sentencing the club were left with no other alternative than to terminate his contract due to the seriousness of the offences".

Following from his release from young offenders, he signed for Northern Premier League Premier Division side Radcliffe in December 2019 and made his first appearance for them in the Boxing Day clash with Atherton Collieries. However, he only went on to make eight appearances before the season was curtailed and eventually expunged following the COVID-19 outbreak in March 2020. When football restarted again for the 2020-21 season, Dolan transferred to fellow Northern Premier League Premier Division side Matlock Town in June 2020.

After a spell with Warrington Rylands, he signed for Fleetwood Town in January 2023.

Personal life
In September 2019, Dolan was sentenced to eight months in a young offender institution following a 98mph police chase on the M60 motorway near Ashton-under-Lyne for dangerous driving and driving whilst disqualified. He had previously been banned from driving following another police chase where he was intoxicated at the wheel.

Career statistics

References

2000 births
Living people
English footballers
Association football midfielders
English Football League players
National League (English football) players
Northern Premier League players
North West Counties Football League players
Stockport Town F.C. players
Altrincham F.C. players
Oldham Athletic A.F.C. players
Ashton United F.C. players
Radcliffe F.C. players
Matlock Town F.C. players
Warrington Rylands 1906 F.C. players
Fleetwood Town F.C. players